Ctenolepisma lineatum is a species of insect of the order Zygentoma. It is similar to the closely related silverfish but can be distinguished by being rather stouter and less shiny with all appendages (antennae and 3 "tails") noticeably longer. The abdomen is often marked with dark brown lines and the species is sometimes called four-lined silverfish.

This species is native to southern Europe but is now found throughout most of the world, aside from polar and cooler temperate regions (e.g. the British Isles), as an accidental introduction. It is found both indoors and outdoors and can be a nuisance pest.

Recent studies on this species in Europe suggest that there is enough geographical variation to justify splitting into several species, with one form already having been given specific status as Ctenolepisma almeriense from south-eastern Spain.

Lepisma pilifera Lucas, 1840, which was considered a synonym of C. lineatum, is now treated as a synonym of Thermobia aegyptiaca (Lucas, 1840).

References

Fauna Europaea
Picture

Lepismatidae
Insects described in 1775
Taxa named by Johan Christian Fabricius
Insects of Europe